Giftgas may refer to:

Giftgas (film) starring Gerhard Dammann
Giftgas (record) on Throbbing Gristle discography
Giftgas, episode in List of Inspector Rex episodes#Season 5
 A German word meaning "poison gas"
 A frequent mis-hearing for Giffgaff (a British mobile phone service), often in the recorded message "This is Giffgaff voicemail"